Vintage Trains is an operator of heritage railtours in the United Kingdom. It is a subsidiary of Birmingham Railway Museum Trust, and is based at Tyseley Locomotive Works, the trust's other subsidiary.

Mainline locomotives
Vintage Trains operates many steam and diesel locomotives on its mainline railtours.

Steam locomotives
Locomotives listed here are not all owned by Tyseley Locomotive Works as some are owned by private societies, but are made available to operate on the mainline by their respective owners (assuming they have the appropriate mainline certification).

All engines used on VT's tours are operated under vacuum braking, engines which do have dual/air braking fitted can be used on VT tours but only operated under vacuum braking (71000 being an example as it's fitted with air brakes).

Diesel locomotives
Loco numbers in bold mean their current number.

Also, in previous years, Vintage Trains has operated charters using electric and diesel traction that has not already been mentioned above, now back at other locations, including Class 86 86259 Les Ross, Class 47 47580 County of Essex, Class 50 50049 Defiance, Class 50 50007 Hercules and Class 20 20007. The company has also used various other diesels, such as West Coast Railways' own Class 33 and Class 47 diesels.

Mainline rolling stock 
Rolling stock listed here is not all owned by Tyseley Locomotive Works as some is owned by private societies, but is made available to operate on the mainline by their respective owners (assuming they have the appropriate mainline certification).

Vintage Trains Community Benefit Society
Until late 2017, Vintage Trains operated its railtours with West Coast Railways providing the crews, WCRC being the only charter operator available who would operate vacuum braked trains as none of the engines based at Tyseley are fitted with air brakes. But from 2018, it was announced that due to a falling number of crews being available, WCR said they were unable to provide footplate crews to operate VT's trains and as a result of this, the early 2018 railtour programme which had been planned including the planned debut run of 7029 Clun Castle had to be cancelled.

In late 2016, Vintage Trains lodged an application with the Office of Rail & Road to operate trains in its own right. To come up with the £800,000 required for the licence, a share float was launched with Adrian Shooter named as chairman. Vintage Trains Community Benefit Society was set up in late 2017 as a publicly owned company and in order to fund the company began recruiting members of the public to become shareholders in the company by purchasing shares (minimum available for purchase being £500 per share). The licence was granted with its first train being a test of a Class 230 between Bedford and Bletchley on 27 September 2018 for Vivarail.

References

External links
Vintage Trains official site